Acacia: The War with the Mein is a 2007 fantasy novel by American author David Anthony Durham. It marks his first foray into epic fantasy, although the novel shares some characteristics of his other works such as the historical novel Pride of Carthage.

Acacia: The War with the Mein has been translated into French, German, Italian, Polish, Portuguese, Brazilian Portuguese, Russian, Spanish, Swedish and has been published in the United Kingdom.

Plot summary 
Leodan Akaran, ruler of the Known World, has inherited generations of apparent peace and prosperity, won ages ago by his ancestors. A widower of high intelligence, he presides over an empire called Acacia, after the idyllic island from which he rules. He dotes on his four children and hides from them the dark realities of traffic in drugs and human lives on which their prosperity depends. He hopes that he might change this, but powerful forces stand in his way. A deadly assassin sent from a race called the Mein, exiled long ago to an ice-locked stronghold in the frozen north, strikes at Leodan in the heart of Acacia while other enemies unleash surprise attacks across the empire. On his deathbed, Leodan puts into play a plan to allow his children to escape, each to their separate destiny. His children begin a quest to avenge their father's death and restore the Acacian empire–this time on the basis of universal freedom.

The novel is notable for the complexity of Durham's imagined world, one in which political, economic, mythological and morally ambiguous forces all influence the fates of the ethnically and culturally diverse population. In some ways the novel uses familiar fantasy frameworks, but over the course of the novel many fantasy tropes are overturned or skewed in surprising ways. It is a fairly self-contained tale, but the author is at work on more volumes set in this world.

Awards and honors 
Winner of the John W. Campbell Award for Best New Writer of Science Fiction and Fantasy
One of Kirkus Reviews Ten Best Works of Fiction in 2007
One of Publishers Weekly'''s Best Books of 2007
Nominated for a Romantic Times 2007 Reviewers' Choice Award
A Fantasy Magazine'' Recommended Fantasy Read of 2007

Film adaptation
In 2008 it was optioned for adaptation as a feature film by Relativity Media, with Michael De Luca to produce and Andrew Grant to write the screenplay.

References

External links 
 
Washington Post Review
Entertainment Weekly Review
Baker's Dozen interview

2007 American novels
American fantasy novels